Chiaverini is an Italian surname. Notable people with the surname include:

Alessio Chiaverini (born 1984), Italian footballer
Darrin Chiaverini (born 1977), American football player and coach
Jennifer Chiaverini (born 1969), American quilter and writer
Ryan Chiaverini, American radio personality

Italian-language surnames